In enzymology, a 4-hydroxyproline epimerase is an enzyme that catalyzes the chemical reaction

trans-4-hydroxy-L-proline  cis-4-hydroxy-D-proline

Hence, this enzyme has one substrate, trans-4-hydroxy-L-proline, and one product, cis-4-hydroxy-D-proline.

This enzyme belongs to the family of isomerases, specifically those racemases and epimerases acting on amino acids and derivatives.  The systematic name of this enzyme class is 4-hydroxyproline 2-epimerase. Other names in common use include hydroxyproline epimerase, hydroxyproline 2-epimerase, and L-hydroxyproline epimerase.  This enzyme participates in arginine and proline metabolism.

References 

 

EC 5.1.1
Enzymes of unknown structure